Richard Wilde Walker (February 16, 1823 – June 16, 1874) was an American politician.

Biography
Walker was born in Huntsville, Alabama in 1823. He was the son of John Williams Walker, the brother of Percy Walker and LeRoy Pope Walker, and father of Richard Wilde Walker, Jr. Richard Walker, Sr. served in the Alabama state legislature from 1851 to 1855, and served as Associate Justice of the Alabama Supreme Court in 1859. Walker represented Alabama in the provisional C.S. Congress from 1861 to 1862. He also served as a Confederate States Senator from 1864 to 1865. he died in Huntsville at age 51.

In popular culture
In the 1992 Harry Turtledove science fiction-alternative history novel The Guns of the South, "Senator Walker" is mentioned as opposing a bill to re-enslave freedmen in a victorious Confederacy, but being blackmailed by the "Rivington" cabal into silencing himself.

References
"Alabama: Her History, Resources, War Record, and Public Men From 1540 to 1872," by Willis Brewer, published 1872, pp. 355–356

External links
 

1823 births
1874 deaths
19th-century American politicians
Confederate States of America senators
Deputies and delegates to the Provisional Congress of the Confederate States
Members of the Alabama House of Representatives
Politicians from Huntsville, Alabama
People of Alabama in the American Civil War
Signers of the Confederate States Constitution
Signers of the Provisional Constitution of the Confederate States
Justices of the Supreme Court of Alabama
Walker family
Lawyers from Huntsville, Alabama
19th-century American judges
19th-century American lawyers